Robert Tyrwhitt (1735–1817) was an English academic.

Robert Tyrwhitt  may also refer to:

Robert Tyrwhitt (courtier) (by 1504–1572), Member of Parliament for Lincolnshire, 1545, and Huntingdonshire in 1554 and 1559
Robert Tyrwhitt (MP died 1581) (c. 1510–1581), MP for Lincolnshire, 1553–1558